Sentinel Peak is located in Death Valley National Park near Panamint City, California.

References

Mountains of Inyo County, California
Mountains of Death Valley National Park
Panamint Range
Death Valley
Mojave Desert
Protected areas of the Mojave Desert
Mountains of Southern California
Mountains of the Mojave Desert